Barritt is an English surname. People with the surname Barritt include:

Brad Barritt (born 1986), South African rugby union player in England
Brian Sydney Barritt (1934–2011), counter-culture author and artist
Daniel Barritt (born 1980), English rally driver
Denis Barritt, Australian magistrate; first coroner investigating Death of Azaria Chamberlain in 1980
John Barritt born Frederick John Barritt (1916–2014), politician and businessman of Bermuda
John Barritt & Son of Bermuda, manufacturers of Barritt's Ginger Beer
Joseph Barritt (1816–1881), South Australian politician and pastoralist
Leon Barritt (1852–1938), American illustrator, journalist, and amateur astronomer
Robert Barritt (–2015), Bermudian artist and politician
Ron Barritt (1919–2004), English (soccer) footballer
Thomas Barritt (1743–1820), British archaeologist and antiquary
Victoria Hamilton-Barritt, British actress

See also
Barrett (surname)

References